"You Put a Move on My Heart" is a song by British recording artist Mica Paris, written and produced by Rod Temperton for her third studio Whisper a Prayer (1993).

Reception
Though not released as a single, the song received general acclaim from critics. Andrew Hamilton of Allmusic expressed, 'Mica Paris' original rendition of Rod Temperton's ballad supreme [...] shames Tamia's more successful rendition'. Hamilton also described the tone of her voice as 'glorious', writing, it 'never pales; it glows like a warm fire as the devastating British woman squeezes the last drop of soul from the lyrics.'

Whilst Entertainment Weekly writer James Earl Hardy described the song as 'sexy R&B', Daryl Easlea of the BBC called it 'beautiful and passionately delivered' he also expressed, 'you long for it being recorded at a different time, not with Paris in front of a keyboard with an orchestra setting button and a drum machine'.

Quincy Jones version

In 1994, Canadian singer Tamia performed at a multiple sclerosis benefit in Aspen, Colorado when she met music manager, Lionel Richie's ex-wife Brenda Richie, who was co-sponsoring the event and introduced herself to Tamia after the show. A few months later, Tamia, who was being courted by Warner Bros. Records at the time, called Richie to say that she was coming to Los Angeles for a photo session, resulting in her lasting stay and a management deal with Richie.

Weeks later, Richie arranged for her to perform at a star-studded party that she held for singer Luther Vandross. Her performance reportedly impressed all in attendance, including veteran producer Quincy Jones, who later offered her the chance to appear on his album, Q's Jook Joint (1995). Overwhelmed by his offer, Tamia recorded vocals for "You Put a Move on My Heart", which Jones later selected as the album's first single. A moderate commercial success, the collaboration earned acclaim from critics; it was later nominated for a Grammy Award.

Charts

References

1993 songs
1995 singles
Quincy Jones songs
Tamia songs
Song recordings produced by Quincy Jones
Songs written by Rod Temperton
Columbia Records singles
Qwest Records singles
Contemporary R&B ballads
Soul ballads
Smooth jazz songs
Mica Paris songs
1990s ballads